El Capitán Trueno y el Santo Grial is a Spanish 2011 sword and sorcery film directed by Antonio Hernández and based on the comic books of El Capitán Trueno. Its stars Sergio Peris-Mencheta and Natasha Yarovenko. The film suffered from problems since its development phase and proved to be a box office failure, also earning very poor reviews.

Plot 
The fiction follows the adventures of the Capitán Trueno and his band, formed by Crispín, Goliat and the princess Sigrid.

Cast

Production 
Earlier failed attempts to bring the comic book character to a live action film involved Juan Piquer Simón, Juanma Bajo Ulloa, Alejandro Toledo and Daniel Calparsoro as possible directors.

At some point Álex González and Elsa Pataky were slated to star as lead characters Capitán Trueno and Sigrid but they left the project. Natasha Yarovenko (originally set to perform a villain role) was subsequently recast to perform the role of Sigrid. Sergio Peris-Mencheta also came in as Capitán Trueno.

Produced by Sorolla Films and Maltés Producciones, filming started on 16 August 2010. Shooting locations included El Escorial, Baños de la Encina (Jaén), Aldea del Rey (Ciudad Real), Lagunas de Ruidera (Albacete), the cave of Las Palomas in Yátova, the Turche Cave in Buñol, Abantos, Chulilla and the Ahuir Beach in Gandía (Valencia), the Saladar d'Aigua Amarga beach in Elche and the Ciudad de la Luz film studio in Alicante. Shooting wrapped in November 2010.

The film had a budget of €8.39 million.

Release 
No member of the cast attended the presentation of the movie in Valencia on 5 October 2011, leaving producer  alone. Vergara was credited as the single screenwriter, but Peris-Mencheta claimed Vergara was opportunistic ("tiene un morro que te cagas") and that the screenplay should be credited to the director too. Days later, Peris-Mencheta attacked Vergara in Twitter, stating "may Pau Vergara pay what he owes and stay away from Spanish cinema forever".

Distributed by Walt Disney España, the film was theatrically released on 7 October 2011.

The film grossed €739,162 euros and 118,749 viewers.

Reception 
The film earned very poor reviews. Reviewing for El País, Javier Ocaña titled his review as deforme insensatez ('warped foolishness'), noting that the "direction of actors is simply nonexistent", positively comparing leading actor Peris-Mencheta to the rest of the cast ("at least he does not take risks"). Even the president of the Academy of Cinematographic Arts and Sciences of Spain raised his opinion on the matter, deeming the film to be a 'drag' (pestiño). The film was presented in media as "the biggest fiasco of Spanish cinema".

See also 
 List of Spanish films of 2011

References

External links 
 El Capitán Trueno y el Santo Grial at ICAA's Catálogo de Cinespañol

2011 films
2010s Spanish-language films
2010s fantasy adventure films
Films shot in Spain
Sword and sorcery films
Films shot at Ciudad de la Luz
Films based on Spanish comics
Spanish fantasy adventure films
2010s Spanish films
Films shot in the province of Ciudad Real
Films shot in the province of Valencia